King Edgar may refer to:

Edgar the Peaceful (942–975), king of England
Edgar, King of Scotland (1074–1107), king of Scotland
Edgar Ætheling (c.1051–c.1126), proclaimed (but never crowned) king of England
Edgar Figaro, a fictional king from Final Fantasy VI